Jull is a surname. Notable people with the name include:

Albert Jull (1864–1940), New Zealand politician 
David Jull (1944–2011), Australian politician
Jack Jull (died 1920), English footballer
Margaret Jull Costa (born 1949), British translator and writer
Peter Jull, Canadian political scientist and academic
Roberta Jull (1872–1961), Australian medical doctor

See also
 Jul (disambiguation)